The illusion of inclusion has been defined as the "sometimes subtle ways that the standards can appear to adequately address race while at the same time marginalizing it."

The illusion of inclusion was characterized by Helen Turnbull in terms of diversity and inclusion; using the baking of a cake as an analogy, diversity was characterized as "the mix" and inclusion was characterized as "the effort that it takes to make the mix work"; with the analogy set, she concluded that "having a diverse workforce does not guarantee that you understand how to make that mix work or how to unlock its full potential." Turnbull highlighted the related concepts of dominant culture and subculture as well as the related dynamics of dominance and privilege in relation to subordinance and assimilation in human relationships; within this dynamic, she highlighted that it was not only a matter of individual self-perception, but the conscious or unconscious perceptions, assumptions, and labels ascribed to or projected onto the individual, which affects the health of the relationships the individual has with other people.

Turnbull also highlighted affinity bias as a related factor, such as involving corporate hiring practices; while affinity bias was indicated to not be exclusive to dominant culture (i.e., culture of white men), in dominant culture, interviewers who showed a biased preference for candidates that were similar to them (e.g., candidates who are "like" the interviewer, candidates who make the interviewer feel "comfortable") were showing an affinity bias; thus, the interviewer may also possess an unconscious bias toward candidates dissimilar to them (e.g., candidates who are "not like" the interviewer, candidates who make the interviewer feel "uncomfortable") possess an unconscious affinity bias. She further adds the factor of assimilation, which she defined as the "need to adjust our style to fit within the dominant organizational and/or cultural norms"; the listed subcomponents of assimilation were feedback (e.g., feedback involving affinity bias, feedback involving group stereotypes operating in concert with confirmation bias, feedback that ignores the positives and presents "development opportunities" through the lens of one's own culture, race, or gender), distancing (e.g., distancing oneself from one's own social identity group), and collusion (i.e., adjusting one's own style to ensure that one is kept politically safe and that members of the dominant culture are kept "comfortable"). Furthermore, she underscored that unconscious and conscious messages, measures, and images of the dominant culture can have a negative impact upon individuals, and thus, lead to assimilation; with the internalization of these messages, measures, and images, she also highlighted that individuals can collude with the dominant culture, and thus, individually self-sabotage.

Race and ethnicity

African-Americans 
Many European-Americans believe that the end of racism has been accomplished and that the United States is a color-blind country. While living in racial isolation (e.g., suburbs, gated communities, public/private schools, religious services, close associations that are primarily/exclusively with other whites), European-Americans are able to receive an abundance of work opportunities, schooling that translates to upward mobility, to have properties that appreciate in value, and live where crime is not generally a concern; this version of America then becomes projected onto the rest of the country. Their encounter with non-European America mostly occurs through television, where the range of stereotypes (e.g., criminal, athlete, success story) can be selected. Depictions of racial minorities in advertisements and token representations in important public and private positions reinforce the perception of racism having ended.

The illegality of being able to discriminate on the basis of skin color (e.g., denying access to employment, housing, public accommodations) leads to color-blind conclusions that the social and economic disparities between racial groups are due to reasons other than racism or discrimination. Coupled with the ideology of neoliberalism, where the functions of the market have presumably rid society of racism's irrationality, colorblindness allows for European-Americans to view the inequalities of race as a consequence of cultural pathologies within racial minorities. Consequently, being able to set aside the historic and present-day racist practices that produce and racialize equality, European-Americans then are able to make the claim that African-Americans and other racial minorities are the ones who culturally construct their own disadvantages.

The foundational conviction of the United States being a meritocracy, along with the combination of neoliberalism's presumed impersonal, nondiscriminatory, rational markets and colorblindness's presumed racial equality, composes the characterized racial and colorblind logic and viewpoint, or the illusion of inclusion, for European-Americans.

Millions of enslaved Africans had their humanity, identity, culture, history, language, and religion taken from them. While divinely gifted to all, freedom in the United States of America was not given for enslaved Africans; rather, it was struggled for and earned in the successes of the American Civil War in 1865. Since the 1960s, following the civil rights movement and colonization of Africa, Africans have continued living in a state of survival, and have sought to restore the identity of Africans since enslavement.

In the 1950s and 1960s, black America had faced many kinds of challenges (e.g., poverty, police brutality, unjust laws and legal system, grief and broken-heartedness due to killing of family members, fear among surviving members that they would be next to suffer or be killed). The Voting Rights Act of 1965 legally allowed for the US federal government to enforce the 15th Amendment (an amendment allowing black men legal right to vote) and 19th Amendment (an amendment allowing women, including black women, the legal right to vote) to the US Constitution in response to the various kinds of voting obstacles (e.g., poll taxes, identification laws, tests, death threats, death, maiming) facing the African-American community and required states to receive federal approval prior to changing their voting laws. Throughout the history of African-Americans, from enslavement to Jim Crow segregation, the challenges of black America have remained in varied form, but with the difference being that African-Americans were not under the illusion of inclusion then.

In 2013, the US Supreme Court overturned significant aspects of the Voting Rights Act, which effectively granted states the power to create laws that weaken black America, allows for southern states previously under the voting rights purview of the federal government to cease being under federal scrutiny, and allows for the altering of legal voting boundaries, instituting of voting identification laws, and enacting of voting identification regulations. In 2015, the Republican-led US Congress did not cooperate with President Obama to support a legislation that was characterized as being able to restore the Voting Rights Act. Rather than be blinded by national politics and the illusion of inclusion, the importance of voting was emphasized, as control of the US presidency and US Congress, affects, not only national policies and relations, but international policies and relations as well.

In a series on race and the illusion of inclusion in the United States of America, the "Rules of Racism" were conveyed, via Hidden Colors III: The Rules of Racism. The "Rules of Racism" were: keep what racism is confounding to all; conceal the contributions of blacks; black women and children are not exceptions to the effects of white supremacy; use compromising blacks to preserve white supremacy; keep blacks under mass control; diminish the importance and effects of enslavement and Jim Crow segregation; keep blacks from being able to economically compete by making policies. In response to these "Rules of Racism", challenges to the rules were then drafted by Monroe Community College’s Diversity Council: instruct others about what racism is; educate and publicize the contributions of blacks; oppose white supremacy (institutional racism); fight white supremacy by celebrating diversity; modify the outcomes society produces for blacks; amplify the importance and effects enslavement and Jim Crow segregation; challenge policies that keep blacks economically unable to compete.

The issue of the illusion of inclusion and black Americans was addressed in regards to Barack Obama as an African-American president of the United States of America. The point of criticism made was of how an educated black American could possibly believe that an African-American president could bring forth meaningful change to a society, such as the United States; the United States has historically been in opposition to black Americans, where black Americans have had to struggle for equal rights, opportunity, and justice, and where race is still an important factor. For instance, a survey done by sociology professor Richard Schuman found that white Americans consider integration to be 15% black American, 85% white American, and always under the authority of a white American. Additionally, he stated that “when White Americans say they favor integrated schools or neighborhoods, what they really mean is a few Black students or families in a predominantly white environment.” The concluding point was that a white supremacist society, rather than being able to be fundamentally changed by an individual, could only be changed by a group that is “united, alert, focused, determined and knowledgeable.”

The inclusion of the African-American community in mainstream American life was characterized as mythical. African-Americans are recommended to not confuse symbolic power with actual power, and that they must confront the illusion of inclusion.

Umar Johnson highlighted that African-American children are increasingly intelligent, and thus, increasingly know what works and what does not work; hence, a conventional prescription given by some adults to simply let the political process take its course to address issues (e.g., police brutality) of the African-American community, which has shown itself to be untrue, is a lie that will not solve the problem. Concerning the history of civil rights, he made note of civil disobedience having a relevant place in the African-American community, as from the struggle for freedom during enslavement, to the Civil Right and Voting Rights Acts, these came by way of breaking some laws. He also expressed disgust for the black community being duped by the illusion of inclusion and, consequently, fighting for every other group of people except their own. He concluded that, as demographic groups (e.g., Latinos, Arabs, GLBT) struggle for their own causes, African-Americans, as their own demographic group, must fight for their own and not everyone else.

Most African-Americans, particularly African-American professionals, are considered to be engrossed in what Minister Louis Farrakhan called the illusion of inclusion. The illusion of inclusion was viewed as being initially made for house slaves, who were characterized as being the most comfortable among enslaved Africans and the easiest to persuade that they had a stake in preserving the status quo—an African servant-European master relationship, where the house slave was quasi-liberated and comfortable, and where treachery of African resistance was considered normal. During the 1960s and 1970s, African-American leadership sought civil rights, as opposed to sovereign rights, which was characterized as a situation akin to prisoners of war seeking decorations for their prison cells rather than prompt liberation. Rather than focus on the collective need for political and economic sovereignty, African-American leadership was focused on inclusion; consequently, despite the perceived drastic decline of the collective status of African-Americans, African-Americans, collectively, are characterized as remaining comfortable in their captivity and engrossed in the illusion of inclusion to the extent that they are unaware of their conceptual imprisonment. The prescribed solution for breaking the mental bonds of their conceptual imprisonment, comfortable captivity, and illusion of inclusion was to immerse themselves in the media (e.g., books, journals, magazines, CDs, videos, audio-tapes) produced by "intellectual maroons" (e.g., Carter G. Woodson, Marcus Garvey, Cheikh Anta Diop, Yosef Ben-Jochannan, Elijah Muhammad, Malcolm X, John Henrik Clarke, Molefi Asante, Maulana Karenga, Amos Wilson, Kwame Akoto, Marimba Ani, Mwalimu Shujaa, Asa Hilliard, Na’im Akbar, Ama Mazama, Chancellor Williams, Karimu Welsh Asante, Frances Cress Welsing, Phil Valentine, Llaila Afrika, Chinweizu), whose African-centered media often draw from African cultural heritage, as well as fellowship and network with them and their supporters at their gatherings (e.g., conferences, workshops).

KIPP: STAR College Preparatory Charter's eighth grade US history contained American traditions, customs and assumptions, which was characterized as an illusion of illusion, in terms of ethnicity and gender, as it was based on the presumption of a single viewpoint that had gaps. For instance, there was a view of Abraham Lincoln as the savior of the Union, along with the excluded understanding that Lincoln's major focus was to preserve the Union even if it that involved preserving slavery.

In a knowledge-based global economy, which relies on a science and engineering workforce, the presumption that an increase in the amount of science and engineering degrees earned by African Americans are mirrored in the science and engineering faculty of colleges and universities was characterized as falling under the illusion of inclusion.

The Council on Social Work Education’s standards have been criticized for their perceived impotence and vagueness, as they contain a pattern, characterized as diversity by numbers, where, representation in faculty, staff, student body, and curriculum has been a focus for groups, such as African-American faculty. With the desegregation of curriculum, personnel, and students, yet a remaining disinclination in the culture of white schools to prioritize equitable treatment and diversity, this is what is viewed as having established it as an illusion of inclusion. An African-centered solution was prescribed to resolve the problem of the illusion of inclusion.

Hispanic and Latino Americans 

In Rodolfo Rosales’ The Illusion of Inclusion: The Untold Political Story of San Antonio, the topic of the illusion of inclusion was detailed. After World War II, when municipal reforms occurred in Sunbelt cities, such as San Antonio, and by the early 1980s, when many of these cities acquired council-district systems, this allowed for the increased representation of minorities in politics. With the Chicano community, via its middle class, which was the most active in the field of urban politics and well-situated to be a force for change, having successfully gained a significant position in politics, inclusion could be viewed as having been achieved. However, the underlying case was that the existing political system adjusted to the Chicano community, co-opted it, and its working class and poor continued to be socially and economically excluded.

The difficulty has been in bringing about effective change in a pro-business, urban political environment and market economy, which are components of the Sunbelt city model. With the shift to the council-district systems, this produced a weakening effect upon parties and community-based organizations and strengthening effect upon individual politicians, as well as shifted the nature of politics from being organizational agenda-based to being personal agenda-based. As organizational agendas can mobilize a community, due to there being direct connection to that community, this allows for the development of community-oriented issues that serve the interests of the community (e.g., Chicano community). With there being a shift toward the predominance of personal agendas, which may be coincidentally community-oriented, this tends to result in a lack of community-oriented issues that can compete with the dominant political and economic priorities of Anglo businesses, thereby, allowing for priorities in the prevailing consensus to favor Anglo businesses.

In California, 65% of the population are of Mexican ancestry, and 20% of the population are an Anglo minority. National City, as with other cities in California, has a large Chicano population, yet, like other cities, also has an Anglo minority that continues to control its economy, politics, and politicians. Despite being the majority population, the Chicano community has remained unrepresented, which reflects the reality of being an illusion of inclusion, if not an actual regression back to the 1960s. The Raza Unida Party was proposed as a solution for the illusion of inclusion.

Rather than failing due to myths such as lack of enrollment, Chicano/a studies has been failing due to the monopolies (e.g., General Education, Electives) that white professors have on the university; white professors operate the university and distribute its benefits to university departments, and are increasingly defensive about their illegitimacy. Mexican students are half the size of the total student population, and there are 12,000 Latinos, yet are disproportionately represented among tenure track professors. Additionally, there are few courses that focus on Mexican experiences, which is an inequity that Chicano/a studies has sought to challenge.

Los Angeles has changed, with the development of a Latino population of over 50% – 80% of that more than 50% whom are of Mexican ancestry. In one instance, the racial disparity between Mexican American students and faculty was highlighted by a Mexican American professor, and, consequently, met with negative responses (e.g., discomfort with discussing race, "unqualified" applicants should not be hired, not seeing color, the unimportance of race) from white professors, despite studies showing that the race and class backgrounds of professors affecting the questions students ask and research outcomes.

Concerning the illusion of inclusion, statistics on Hispanic participation in the United States show that the US social system marginalizes and excludes Hispanics rather than integrates and includes them.

Additional examples 

Demographic data has served as a justification for inclusion. With the exclusion of blacks and Latinos, inclusion eventually became a guiding principle in the civil rights movement. Since the 1960s, diversity has become associated with access and representation has become a relevant consideration. At California State University, Northridge, its characterized one-size-fits-all model produced its illusion of inclusion due to a perceived lack of substantive change being made in terms of power.

In 2008, the US presidential election presented the rare opportunity to investigate race, class, and gender-related issues. Rather than interrogate the matrix of identity represented by the election's leading candidates, conventional biases and reductionist thinking about the matrix of identity (e.g., race, class, gender) facilitated the preservation of the illusion of inclusion.

Race, culture and difference can be systemically centralized and obscured as the illusion of inclusion.

The European Union reception system is perceived to be an illusion of inclusion system that marginalizes non-wealthy and vulnerable people, which forces them to engage in illegal and criminal activities.

Sex, sexuality, and gender 

The Illusion of Inclusion: Women in Postsecondary Education highlighted the illusion of inclusion within the context of postsecondary education. Women of Canada have had limited access to higher education and unequal participation in comparison to men. Discrimination and marginalization of women on the campuses of Canada have occurred, spanning from the institutional to the interpersonal. It highlighted topics such as the risk of physical and sexual assault on campus, sexual harassment in classes and professors’ offices, jokes of male professors and students being encouraged despite being racist, sexist, or homophobic in nature, a lack of female role models (e.g., professors) for women (e.g., Aboriginal women, black women), and insufficient attention given to female students by professors.

Many cosmetic companies that once exclusively featured white women for their advertisements and as spokeswomen for their products have added light-skinned women of color. As part of the illusion of inclusion, the marketing strategy employed was characterized as being purposed for attracting women of color, who might feel alienated by products exclusively marketed by whites, via inclusion of a few light-skinned, women of color with Anglo-features; this allowed for the illusion of inclusion to be cast while simultaneously still promoting a message about the beauty of whiteness.

The illusion of inclusion enables white feminists to retain white feminist racism in the feminist movement under the pretense of diversity.

While there have been new rights and protections acquired for GLBTQ individuals in the United States, the model of inclusion and homonormativity has usually privileged well-to-do, white, homosexual men. Closer examination needs to be given as to how these progressive practices (e.g., practices in schools) serve to benefit some GLBTQ individuals, while serving to detriment other GLBTQ individuals, usually along the intersecting lines of race, gender, sexuality, and class. In particular, how power relations inform the concepts of GLBTQ "inclusion." Critical examination of inclusion and GLBTQ curricular resources has shown that GLBTQ inclusionary practices are actually limited and exclusionary; additionally, it has shown that these practices are essentially re-inventions of the existing power structures of oppression, and are parts of a greater project of homonationalism, which results in homonormative subjects being changed into ideal members of the country.

Due to heteronormative bias and the illusion of inclusion in the gender paradigm, intimate partner violence tends to assume a male perpetrator and female victim. Perpetrators can be gay, lesbian, bisexual, and transgender.

References 

Prejudice and discrimination